This is a list of the number-one songs between 2002 and 2007 in Mexico. Chart rankings are based on airplay across radio states in Mexico utilizing the Radio Tracking Data, LLC in real time. Between 2002 and 2005, Monitor Latino did not publish a General chart, instead it published three separate charts: "Pop", "Grupero" (Grupera Ballads and Regional Mexican music, it later changed its name to "Regional") and "Sonidero" (Tropical music, it later changed its name to "Tropical" and was discontinued in 2005). In 2007, Monitor Latino began to publish a General chart as well.

2002

2003

2004

2005

2007 

Monitor Latino began issuing a General chart in 2007. In addition, the "Grupero" chart was renamed as "Regional", an "Inglés" (English) chart was added, and the "Tropical" chart was discontinued.

Chart history (General and Pop)

Chart history (Regional and English)

See also
List of number-one albums of 2007 (Mexico)

References

2002-2007
Mexico